Beechwood is an unincorporated community in Wyoming County, West Virginia, United States.

References

Unincorporated communities in West Virginia
Unincorporated communities in Wyoming County, West Virginia
Populated places on the Guyandotte River